Leonidas Argyropoulos (born 29 May 1990) is a Greek professional footballer who plays as a right-back for PAS KORINTHOS

Club career
On 20 January 2009, Argyropoulos made his professional debut in the fifth round of the 2008–09 Greek Cup, playing for Asteras Tripolis in a 2–0 victory over Iraklis.

External links
 
Profile at Sport.gr
Guardian Football

1990 births
Living people
Greek footballers
Greece under-21 international footballers
Asteras Tripolis F.C. players
Platanias F.C. players
Panionios F.C. players
Apollon Smyrnis F.C. players
Iraklis Thessaloniki F.C. players
OFI Crete F.C. players
Super League Greece players
Association football fullbacks
Footballers from Corinth